József Albert (7 May 1912 – 16 April 1994) was a Hungarian footballer who played his entire career for Szegedi AK.

Career

Club
Albert played for Szegedi AK from 1930 until 1941.

Manager
Albert mainly coached Hungarian teams such as FK Sport Bezdan, Szegedi AK, Komlói Bányász SK, Videoton FC, Szombathelyi Haladás VSE and Vasas SC. He won the Mitropa Cup with Vasas SC in 1970.

Albert went to the Middle East in 1950s to coach the Syria national football team in which he won the 1957 Pan Arab Games, and later in Lebanon in 1960s.

Honours
 As a coach
 Pan Arab Games:
 1957
 Mitropa Cup:
 1970

References

1912 births
1994 deaths
Hungarian footballers
Hungarian football managers
Hungarian expatriate football managers
Syria national football team managers
Fehérvár FC managers
Szombathelyi Haladás football managers
Vasas SC managers
Association footballers not categorized by position